Robert Torrens may refer to:

 Robert Torrens (judge) (1775–1856), Irish judge
 Robert Torrens (economist) (1780–1864), Irish economist and Royal Marines officer, chair of the South Australian Colonisation Commission, cousin of the above
 Robert Torrens (British Army officer) (1780–1840), British Army officer who fought at the Battle of Waterloo
 Robert Torrens (Irish politician) (1810–1874), Irish Conservative politician
 Sir Robert Richard Torrens (1812–1884), Irish-born colonial administrator and politician in South Australia and the United Kingdom, founded Torrens Title, son of the economist
 Roy Torrens (Robert Torrens, 1948–2021), Irish cricketer